The 2019 William Hill World Darts Championship was the 26th World Championship organised by the Professional Darts Corporation since it separated from the British Darts Organisation. The event took place at Alexandra Palace in London from 13 December 2018 to 1 January 2019.

In the biggest overhaul since 2006, when 16 extra participants were added, the number of participants increased from 72 to 96. The top 32 from the PDC Order of Merit competed with the 32 highest ranked players on the PDC Pro Tour Order of Merit and 32 qualifiers from around the world, including two female darts players. The tournament length was consequently increased from six to seven rounds, while the preliminary round was dropped. The tournament was played in 28 afternoon and evening sessions (an increase of six sessions over 2018) over the 20-day period with four rest days included for both Christmas and also New Year's Eve, with 95 matches played.

Rob Cross was the defending champion, but lost 4–2 to Luke Humphries in the fourth round. 
Michael van Gerwen won his third world title with a 7–3 victory over Michael Smith.

It was the first PDC World Championship without retired Phil Taylor, and the first time Taylor had not played in either World Championship since 1989. 2004 runner-up Kevin Painter was also a notable absentee, failing to qualify for the first time since 1997, when he was a BDO player.

Prize money

The prize money for the tournament was £2,500,000 in total, £700,000 more than 2018. The winner's prize money was £500,000, adding £100,000 to the previous year's winners share.

Qualification

Qualifiers

Order of MeritSecond round (seeded)
 Michael van Gerwen (champion)
 Rob Cross (fourth round)
 Peter Wright (second round)
 Gary Anderson (semi-finals)
 Daryl Gurney (third round)
 Gerwyn Price (second round)
 Mensur Suljović (second round)
 Simon Whitlock (second round)
 James Wade (fourth round)
 Michael Smith (runner-up)
 Ian White (second round)
 Dave Chisnall (quarter-finals)
 Darren Webster (second round)
 Joe Cullen (second round)
 Jonny Clayton (second round)
 Adrian Lewis (fourth round)
 Raymond van Barneveld (second round)
 Stephen Bunting (second round)
 Mervyn King (third round)
 Steve Beaton (second round)
 Kim Huybrechts (third round)
 Steve West (third round)
 John Henderson (third round)
 Jelle Klaasen (second round)
 Alan Norris (third round)
 James Wilson (second round)
 Kyle Anderson (third round)
 Jamie Lewis (fourth round)
 Jermaine Wattimena (third round)
 Benito van de Pas (fourth round)
 Cristo Reyes (third round)
 Max Hopp (third round)

Pro TourFirst Round
  Danny Noppert (second round)
  Krzysztof Ratajski (first round)
  Ricky Evans (first round)
  Jeffrey de Zwaan (second round)
  Steve Lennon (second round)
  Chris Dobey (fourth round)
  Martin Schindler (first round)
  Josh Payne (second round)
  Gabriel Clemens (second round)
  Ryan Joyce (quarter-finals)
  Richard North (second round)
  Keegan Brown (third round)
  Mickey Mansell (first round)
  Robert Thornton (first round)
  Jan Dekker (second round)
  Nathan Aspinall (semi-finals)
  Ron Meulenkamp (second round)
  Brendan Dolan (quarter-finals)
  William O'Connor (third round)
  Vincent van der Voort (third round)
  Michael Barnard (second round)
  Toni Alcinas (third round)
  Paul Nicholson (first round)
  Simon Stevenson (first round)
  Luke Humphries (quarter-finals)
  Jeffrey de Graaf (first round)
  Dimitri Van den Bergh (third round)
  Alan Tabern (second round)
  Wayne Jones (first round)
  Ross Smith (second round)
  Ryan Searle (fourth round)
  Matthew Edgar (first round)

International qualifiersfirst round
  Seigo Asada (PDJ Qualifier) (second round)
  Lisa Ashton (Women's Qualifier) (first round)
  James Bailey (Oceanic Master) (first round)
  Kevin Burness (Irish Matchplay Champion) (second round)
  Stephen Burton (PDPA Qualifier) (first round)
  José de Sousa (South/West Europe Qualifier) (first round)
  Anastasia Dobromyslova (Women's Qualifier) (first round)
  Ted Evetts (Development Tour) (second round)
  Cody Harris (Challenge Tour) (second round)
  Adam Hunt (PDPA Qualifier) (first round)
  Lourence Ilagan (Asian Tour) (first round)
  Aden Kirk (PDPA Qualifier) (first round)
  Boris Koltsov (Euroasian Qualifier) (first round)
  Nitin Kumar (Indian Qualifier) (first round)
  Darius Labanauskas (PDCNB) (third round)
  Royden Lam (Asian Tour) (first round)
  Daniel Larsson (PDCNB) (second round)
  Paul Lim (Asian Tour) (first round)
  Yuanjun Liu (China Qualifier) (first round)
  Jim Long (CDC Tour) (second round)
  Noel Malicdem (Asian Tour) (second round)
  Robert Marijanović (German Super League) (first round)
  Yordi Meeuwisse (Western Europe Qualifier) (first round)
  Geert Nentjes (Development Tour) (first round)
  Devon Petersen (Africa Qualifier) (fourth round)
  Diogo Portela (SADC Qualifier) (first round)
  Chuck Puleo (CDC Tour) (first round)
  Rowby-John Rodriguez (South/East Europe Qualifier) (second round)
  Craig Ross (DPNZ Runner-up) (first round)
  Karel Sedláček (East Europe Qualifier) (first round)
  Jeff Smith (North American Champion) (first round)
  Raymond Smith (DPA Tour) (first round)

Notes

Background
96 players competed in the championship, an increase of 24 from the 2018 tournament; with the thirty-two highest ranked players on the PDC Order of Merit being seeded to the second round, and the next thirty-two highest ranked players from the 2018 PDC Pro Tour Order of Merit and thirty-two players from a number of international and invitational qualifiers going into the first round.

Michael van Gerwen, the winner of the 2014 and 2017 championships, was top of the two-year PDC Order of Merit and number one seed going into the tournament. Rob Cross was second seed and reigning champion, having won the 2018 championship on his debut. As well as van Gerwen and Cross, three other previous PDC world champions qualified as seeds, two-time champions Gary Anderson and Adrian Lewis, and 2007 champion Raymond van Barneveld. Three other seeds, 18th seeded Stephen Bunting, 20th seeded Steve Beaton and 24th seeded Jelle Klaasen, were previous champions of the BDO World Darts Championship, as was van Barneveld.

The top seeds below van Gerwen and Cross were 2018 World Grand Prix runner-up Peter Wright, Gary Anderson, 2018 Players Championship Finals winner Daryl Gurney and 2018 Grand Slam of Darts winner Gerwyn Price.

Danny Noppert, in his debut year with the PDC, was the highest ranked non-seed on the 2018 PDC Pro Tour Order of Merit. As well as Noppert, 5 other qualifiers through the Pro Tour made their debut; Gabriel Clemens, Ryan Joyce, Nathan Aspinall, Ryan Searle and Matthew Edgar. Edgar took the final qualification place after 2018 UK Open runner-up Corey Cadby withdrew. The list of qualifiers also included the 2018 Youth Champion Dimitri Van den Bergh and 2018 World Matchplay semi-finalist Jeffrey de Zwaan.

As part of the expansion of the world championship, there was an increase in the number of tournaments and ranking systems offering qualification places. Places were now offered to the winner of the Challenge Tour, the top two from the Development Tour (where previously only the winner had qualified), the top four of the new Asian Tour, and the top American and Canadian players on the North American Championship Darts Circuit. Previous qualification places to the top two players on the Nordic & Baltic rankings and the winner of the Dartplayers Australia rankings also remained.

The international qualifiers included new Indian and African qualifiers, and the Southern Europe qualifier being split into South/West and South/East. Tahuna Irwin, who won the New Zealand qualifier, had to withdraw after being denied entry to the UK, and subsequently being banned from entry, when attempting to compete in the 2018 PDC World Youth Championship. His place was given to the New Zealand runner-up, Craig Ross.

The tournament also saw two tournaments to qualify female players for the tournament. This followed the wildcard invitations of Gayl King to the 2001 tournament and Anastasia Dobromyslova to the 2009 tournament, and also came in the wake of the qualification of China's Momo Zhou for the 2018 PDC World Cup of Darts. Dobromyslova, three times BDO women's world champion, returned to the PDC championship after winning the rest of the world tournament, while the UK tournament was won by four time women's world champion, and reigning 2018 champion, Lisa Ashton.

The final placings were determined by the PDPA qualifier held at Arena MK on 26 November, with two places as standard and an extra place as Youth Champion Van den Bergh had already qualified. Stephen Burton, Adam Hunt and Aden Kirk took the three places, all three of them making their debuts.

In addition to the three PDPA qualifiers, 15 more of the international qualifiers were making their PDC World Championship debuts, Lisa Ashton, James Bailey, Kevin Burness, Nitin Kumar, Darius Labanauskas, Daniel Larsson, Yuanjun Liu, Jim Long, Noel Malicdem, Yordi Meeuwisse, Geert Nentjes, Chuck Puleo, Craig Ross, Karel Sedláček and Raymond Smith. Labanauskas was the first ever Lithuanian to qualify for the PDC World Championship.

Summary

The top quarter of the draw saw number one seed Michael van Gerwen easily reach the quarter-final, knocking Alan Tabern out in the second round despite having beer thrown at him during the walk on, before consecutive 4–1 victories over Max Hopp and former world champion Adrian Lewis. Other former champion Raymond van Barneveld was eliminated in the second round following a 3–2 loss to Darius Labanauskas. James Wade controversially beat Seigo Asada in the second round, having been perceived to have shouted in his opponent's face after winning the second set, and saying after the match that he "wanted to hurt" Asada; Wade subsequently apologised, citing a hypomania episode. Wade was eliminated in the fourth round by debutant Ryan Joyce. In the quarter-final, van Gerwen triumphed over Joyce, 5–1, to qualify for the semi-final for the sixth time in seven championships.

In the second quarter, fourth seed Gary Anderson had to come through last-set deciders against Jermaine Wattimena and Chris Dobey to reach the quarter-final, while fifth-seed Daryl Gurney was eliminated in the third round by 2018 semi-finalist Jamie Lewis. Dave Chisnall came back from 0–2 down against Josh Payne to run off eleven consecutive sets over three matches, beating Payne 3–2 before 4–0 wins over Kim Huybrechts and Lewis. In the quarter-final, Anderson won 5–2 against Chisnall to set up a semi-final with van Gerwen.

In the third quarter, reigning champion Rob Cross defeated Jeffrey de Zwaan in the second round, before beating Cristo Reyes 4–0 in the third round. Two-time consecutive world youth champion Dimitri Van den Bergh was beaten by two-time consecutive Development Tour winner Luke Humphries in the third round. In round four, Humphries played Cross. The defending champion went 2–0 up, before Humphries fought back to win 4–2 and end Cross's reign. Seventh-seed Mensur Suljović was eliminated by Ryan Searle, and tenth-seed Michael Smith eliminated Ron Meulenkamp before beating John Henderson and Searle to reach the quarter-final. Smith secured a semi-final slot with a 5–1 win over Humphries.

In the fourth quarter, the four top seeds were eliminated in the second round, with third-seed Peter Wright losing to Toni Alcinas, sixth-seed Gerwyn Price being eliminated by Nathan Aspinall, eleventh-seeded Ian White losing to South African Devon Petersen and Brendan Dolan whitewashing fourteenth seed Joe Cullen. Further seeds were eliminated in the third round, with thirtieth seed Benito van de Pas being the only seed from this quarter in the fourth round, and unseeded players Aspinall, Petersen and Dolan taking the other three slots. Aspinall defeated Petersen, with Dolan getting a 4–1 win over van de Pas to reach the quarter-final. In the quarter-final, Aspinall easily beat Dolan 5–1 to reach the semi-final on his debut year.

In the first semi-final, Aspinall played Smith. Smith won the first two sets without dropping a leg, before Aspinall came back to make it 2–2. Each player won one of the next two sets to make it 3–3, before Smith won two consecutive sets 3–1 and the final set 3–0 to win the match and qualify for the first World Championship final of his career. Smith scored 17 180s, the most by a player in a World Championship semi-final.

In the second semi-final, Anderson played van Gerwen in a repeat of the 2017 final. After van Gerwen won the first set in a last-leg decider, he then won twelve of the next thirteen legs to quickly take a 5–0 lead in the first-to-six match. Anderson managed to avoid the whitewash by winning the sixth set, but van Gerwen completed the rout in the next set, qualifying for the final for the fourth time in his career.

In the final, held on New Year's Day 2019, van Gerwen won the first two legs before missing one set-dart in each of the next two legs for Smith to force a last-leg set decider, which van Gerwen won. Van Gerwen broke Smith's throw with a 3–1 win in the second set, and lengthened his lead by taking the third set by the same scoreline. Smith lost the fourth set after missing four darts at double 12 in the decider, but won the fifth set 3–2 to avoid the whitewash and took the sixth set 3–0. Van Gerwen restored his three-set advantage with a 3–1 win in the seventh set. Smith missed three darts for the eighth set, which van Gerwen won to go one set away from victory. The ninth set went to a deciding leg, which Smith won to prolong the match. Van Gerwen took the first two legs in the tenth set, and missed one dart for the championship in the third leg; in the next, he hit double 16 to take the set and win the World Championship for the third time.

Schedule

Draw

Finals

Top half

Section 1

Section 2

Bottom half

Section 3

Section 4

Final

Top averages
This table shows the highest averages achieved by players throughout the tournament.

Representation
This table shows the number of players by country in the 2019 PDC World Championship. A total of 28 nationalities were represented, the most ever at a darts world championship. The second round sees an increase in participation for some countries due to the first round bye for the 32 highest ranked players.

References

External links
Official website

World Championship
World Championship
2018 sports events in London
2019 sports events in London
2018 in British sport
2019 in British sport
International sports competitions in London
2019
Alexandra Palace
December 2018 sports events in the United Kingdom
January 2019 sports events in the United Kingdom